San Félix District is a district (distrito) of Chiriquí Province in Panama. The population according to the 2000 census was 5,276. The district covers a total area of 220 km². The capital lies at the city of Las Lajas.

Administrative divisions
San Félix District is divided administratively into the following corregimientos:

Las Lajas (capital)
Juay
San Félix
Lajas Adentro
Santa Cruz

References

Districts of Panama
Chiriquí Province